David Wagner defeated the three-time defending champion Peter Norfolk in the final, 6–2, 6–3 to win the quad singles wheelchair tennis title at the 2011 Australian Open.

Seeds
 David Wagner (champion)
 Peter Norfolk (finals)

Draw

Final

Round robin
Standings are determined by: 1. number of wins; 2. number of matches; 3. in two-players-ties, head-to-head records; 4. in three-players-ties, percentage of sets won, or of games won; 5. steering-committee decision.

External links 
 Main Draw

Wheelchair Quad Singles
2011 Quad Singles